Juglans nigra, the eastern American black walnut, is a species of deciduous tree in the walnut family, Juglandaceae, native to North America. It grows mostly in riparian zones, from southern Ontario, west to southeast South Dakota, south to Georgia, northern Florida and southwest to central Texas. Wild trees in the upper Ottawa Valley may be an isolated native population or may have derived from planted trees.

Black walnut is an important tree commercially, as the wood is a deep brown color and easily worked. Walnut seeds (nuts) are cultivated for their distinctive and desirable taste. Walnut trees are grown both for lumber and food, and many cultivars have been developed for improved quality wood or nuts. Black walnut is susceptible to thousand cankers disease, which provoked a decline of walnut trees in some regions.

Black walnut is anecdotally known for being allelopathic, which means that it releases chemicals from its roots and other tissues that may harm other organisms and give the tree a competitive advantage. There is not, however, solid scientific consensus that allelopathic chemicals in black walnut are the primary source of its competitive growth in an area.

Description 
Odor Most parts of the tree including leaves, stems, and fruit husks have a very characteristic pungent or spicy odor. This odor is lacking in the nut itself.
Trunk Height . Under forest competition, it develops a tall and straight trunk. When grown in an open area it has a short trunk and broad crown.
Bark The bark is typically grey-black and deeply furrowed into thin ridges that gives the bark a diamond shaped pattern.
Pith The pith of the twigs is chambered and light brown.
Buds The buds are pale silky and covered in downy hairs.
Leaves The leaves are pinnately compound and alternately arranged on the stem. The leaflets have a rounded base and a long pointed (acuminate) tip as well as having a serrated edge. The leaves are overall dark green in color and are typically hairy on the underside.
Leaf scar The leaf scar has three prominent bundle scars and has a notch on the side that points toward the tip of the branch (distal side)
Flowers Black walnut is monoecious. These are borne from axillary buds on the previous year's growth. The female (pistillate) flowers are terminal, in clusters of two to five on the current year's growth.
Fruit Ripens during the summer/autumn into a spherical fruit (nut) with a brownish-green, semifleshy husk and a brown, corrugated nut. The whole fruit, including the husk falls in October; the seed is relatively small and very hard.

 The fruit production tends to occur irregularly with some years producing larger crops than others (see mast year). Fruiting may begin when the tree is 4–6 years old, but large crops take 20 years. Total lifespan of J. nigra is about 130 years. Like other trees of the order Fagales, such as oaks, hickories, chestnuts, and birches, it is monoecious, with wind-pollinated catkins. Male and female flowers are in separate spikes, and the female flowers typically appear before the male on a single tree (dichogamy). As a consequence, self-pollination is unlikely. However, individual trees are commonly self-compatible; if they are not pollinated by neighboring trees, they may set self-fertilized seeds. For maximum seed germination, the seeds should be cold-moist stratified for 3–4 months, although the exact time depends on the seed source. The seedlings emerge in April or May. While most trees with taproots have a reputation for slow growth, black walnut is an exception and can achieve very rapid growth in the seedling stage, typically  their first year and even more in the second year. Black walnut will not leaf out until temperatures have warmed sufficiently. Leafout in spring is initiated when daytime highs reach approximately 70 °F (21 °C) and leaf drop in fall when daytime highs fall below 65 °F (15 °C). As such, the exact timing will vary in different regions of the US and depending on the weather conditions from year to year, leafout is typically early April in the southern part of its range and sometimes not until the end of May or beginning of June in cooler areas. Leaf drop in fall may begin in late September in cooler regions and not until November in southern areas.

Black walnut has a strong taproot, which makes the seedlings resilient, but difficult to transplant.

Black walnut is more resistant to frost than the English or Persian walnut, but thrives best in the warmer regions of fertile, lowland soils with high water tables, although it will also grow in drier soils, but much more slowly. Some soils preferred by black walnut include Alfisol and Entisol soil types. Black walnut grows best on sandy loam, loam, or silt loam type soils but will also grow well on silty clay loam soils. It prefers these soils because they hold large quantities of water, which the tree draws from during rainless periods.

Visually, black walnut is similar to the butternut (Juglans cinerea) in leaf shape, and the range also overlaps significantly. The fruits are quite different, and their presence makes an identification easy, as black walnut fruits are round (spherical) and butternuts are more oval-oblong shaped. When a fruit is not available, two species can be differentiated based on the leaf scars, or the place where the leaf meets the stem: butternut has a leaf scar with a flat upper edge and with a velvety ridge above that flat part, but black walnut has an indented leaf scar with no hairy ridge.

Ecology 
Black walnut is primarily a pioneer species similar to red and silver maple and black cherry. Because of this, black walnut is a common weed tree found along roadsides, fields, and forest edges in the eastern US. It will grow in closed forests, but is classified as shade intolerant; this means it requires full sun for optimal growth and nut production.

Black walnut's native range extends across much of the eastern US. It is absent from the coastal plain south of North Carolina as well as the Mississippi Valley, and does not occur in the northern tier of the eastern US, where the frost-free season is too short for the nuts to develop. Its western range extends all the way to the eastern Great Plains, after which climate conditions become too dry for it.

Black walnut is one of the most abundant trees in the eastern US, particularly the Northeast, and its numbers are increasing due to epidemics that have affected other tree species, including emerald ash borer, chestnut blight, butternut canker, wooly hemlock adelgid, dogwood anthracnose, Dutch elm disease, and Gypsy moth infestations. Widespread clear-cutting of oaks due to Gypsy moth damage in the 1970s-80s particularly aided in the tree's spread. The aggressive competitive strategy of black walnut such as its fast growth, alleopathic chemicals, and rodent-dispersed seeds, have also contributed.

 The nuts are food for many rodents and make up to 10% of the diet of eastern fox squirrels. The nuts are also eaten by species of birds. The leaves are browsed by white tailed deer, although they are not a preferred food. Squirrels also eat the nuts.

Where the range of the eastern black walnut overlaps that of the Texas black walnut (J. microcarpa), the two species sometimes interbreed, producing populations with characteristics intermediate between the two species. J.nigra and J. cinerea often grow in the same range as well but they do not hybridize naturally.

The tree's roots often form endomycorrhizal relationships with fungi in the genus Glomus. Some endomycorrhizal relations improve the plant's growth.

Species often associated with J. nigra include yellow-poplar (Liriodendron tulipifera), white ash (Fraxinus americana), black cherry (Prunus serotina), basswood (Tilia americana), American beech (Fagus grandifolia), sugar maple (Acer saccharum), oaks (Quercus spp.), and hickories (Carya spp.). Near the western edge of its range, black walnut may be confined to floodplains, where it grows either with American elm (Ulmus americana), common hackberry (Celtis occidentalis), green ash (Fraxinus pennsylvanica), and boxelder (Acer negundo), or with basswood and red oak (Quercus rubra) on lower slopes and other favorable sites.

Cultivation

Planting 
 While its primary native region is the Midwest and east-central United States, the black walnut was introduced into Europe in 1629 and is also cultivated in Hawaii. It is cultivated there and in North America as a forest tree for its high-quality wood. Black walnut plantings can be made to produce timber, nuts, or both timber and nuts. Patented timber-type trees were selected and released from Purdue University in the early 1990s. These trees have been sporadically available from nurseries. Varieties include Purdue #1, which can be used for both timber and nut production, though nut quality is poor compared to varieties selected specifically as nut producers.

Grafted, nut-producing trees are available from several nurseries operating in the U.S. Selections worth considering include Thomas, Neel #1, Thomas Myers, Pounds #2, Stoker, Surprise, Emma K, Sparrow, S127, and McGinnis. Several older varieties, such as Kwik Krop, are still in cultivation; while they make decent nuts, they would not be recommended for commercial planting.

Pollination requirements should be considered when planting black walnuts. As is typical of many species in Juglandaceae, Juglans nigra trees tend to be monoecious, i.e.. produce pollen first and then pistillate flowers or else produce pistillate flowers and then pollen. An early pollen-producer should be grouped with other varieties that produce pistillate flowers so all varieties benefit from overlap. Cranz, Thomas, and Neel #1 make a good pollination trio. A similar group for more northern climates would be Sparrow, S127, and Mintle.

Sometimes black walnut is planted as part of reclaiming mines. When growing young trees weed control is critical for healthy establishment of the trees, without weed control the young trees are harmed significantly in their growth rate.

Ornamental
It has gained the Royal Horticultural Society's Award of Garden Merit.

Uses

As food

Black walnut nuts are edible and shelled commercially in the United States. About 65% of the annual wild harvest comes from the U.S. state of Missouri, and the largest processing plant is operated by Hammons Products in Stockton, Missouri. NPR affiliate KCUR stated in an article that “Ralph Hammons began the company in 1946 with a nut cracking machine acquired from Tennessee.” The Stockton Black Walnut Festival, which has been held annually since 1961, “brings the community together for a 3-day event jam-packed with activities including a carnival, tractor pull, nut roll and 2-hour parade,” stated Alexa Hodges in a VOX article. The nutmeats provide a robust, distinctive, natural flavor and crunch as a food ingredient.  Popular uses include ice cream, bakery goods and confections.  Consumers include black walnuts in traditional treats, such as cakes, cookies, fudge, and pies, during the fall holiday season.  The nuts' nutritional profile leads to uses in other foods, such as salads, fish, pork, chicken, vegetables and pasta dishes.

Tapped in spring, the tree yields a sweet sap that can be drunk or concentrated into syrup or sugar that is not unlike the sap of sugar maple.

Nut processing by hand

The extraction of the kernel from the fruit of the black walnut is difficult.  The thick, hard shell is tightly bound by tall ridges to a thick husk. Rolling the nut underfoot on a hard surface such as a driveway is a common method; commercial huskers use a car tire rotating against a metal mesh.  Some take a thick plywood board and drill a nut-sized hole in it (from one to two inches in diameter) and smash the nut through using a hammer.  The nut goes through and the husk remains behind. American pioneers let the nuts dry in the sun, then removed the husks and let the kernels dry—making them less bitter.

The shell itself is thicker than that of the English walnut, and there are additional, thick internal walls tightly surrounding the nutmeat. Walnuts are too tough and too large to be opened with a standard nutcracker, but simply cracking the shell open with a rock results in smashed and shattered nutmeats mixed with shell, unless done with some care and skill—and it is still nearly impossible to extract an intact half this way. As a result, a number of home walnut-cracking devices have been produced, involving vices, cams, or levers.

While the flavor of the Juglans nigra kernel is prized, the difficulty in preparing it may account for the wider popularity and availability of the English walnut.

Nutrition
Black walnut kernels are 5% water, 59% fat, 24% protein, and 10% carbohydrates (table). In a 100 gram reference amount providing 619 calories, the kernels supply several dietary minerals in rich content (20% or more of the Daily Value, DV), including manganese (186% DV) and phosphorus (73% DV) among others, and the B vitamins, B6 (45% DV) and pantothenic acid (33% DV) (table). Black walnut kernels are a moderate source of vitamin E (14% DV).

Analysis of black walnut fat content in its oil showed the most prevalent fatty acids are linoleic acid (33.8%), followed (in the same units) by oleic acid (15.3%), linolenic acid (2.7%), palmitic acid (1.9%), and stearic acid (1.5%) (USDA table).

Dye 
Black walnut drupes contain juglone (5-hydroxy-1,4-naphthoquinone), plumbagin (yellow quinone pigments), and tannin. These compounds cause walnuts to stain cars, sidewalks, porches, and patios, in addition to the hands of anyone attempting to shell them.
The brownish-black dye was used by early American settlers to dye hair. According to Eastern Trees in the Petersen Guide series, black walnuts make a yellowish-brown dye, not brownish-black. The apparent confusion is easily explained by the fact that the liquid (dye) obtained from the inner husk becomes increasingly darker over time, as the outer skin darkens from light green to black. Extracts of the outer, soft part of the drupe are still used as a natural dye for handicrafts.
The tannins present in walnuts act as a mordant, aiding in the dyeing process, and are usable as a dark ink or wood stain.

Industrial 
Walnut shells are often used as an abrasive in sand blasting or other circumstances where a medium hardness grit is required. The hard black walnut shell is also used commercially in abrasive cleaning, a filtering agent in scrubbers in smoke stacks, cleaning jet engines, cosmetics, and oil well drilling and water filtration.

Wood 

Black walnut is highly prized for its dark-colored, straight grained, true heartwood. It is heavy, strong, shock resistant and yet can be easily split and worked. Along with cedars (Thuja spp.), chestnut (Castanea spp.), and black locust (Robinia pseudoacacia) black walnut is one of the most durable hardwoods in the US. The wood can be kiln dried and holds its shape well after seasoning, which makes this wood even more attractive for wood working.

Walnut wood has historically been used for gun stocks, furniture, flooring, paddles, coffins, and a variety of other wood products. Black walnut has a density of 660 kg per cubic meter (41.2 lb/cubic foot), which makes it less dense than oak.

Pests 
Maggots (larvae of Rhagoletis completa and Rhagoletis suavis) in the husk are common, though more a nuisance than a serious problem for amateurs, who may simply remove the affected husk as soon as infestation is noticed. The maggots develop entirely within the husk, thus the quality of the nutmeat is not affected.  However, infestations of maggots are undesirable because they make the husk difficult to remove and are unsightly.  Maggots can be serious for commercial walnut growers, who tend to use chemical treatments to prevent damage to the crop.  Some non-chemical controls also exist, such as removing and disposing of infested nuts.

The adult sucks plant juices through a snout. The eggs are laid in fruits in the spring and summer. Many nuts are lost due to damage from the larvae, which burrow through the nut shell.

Black walnut is affected by European canker (Neonectria galligena). The infection spreads slowly but infected trees eventually die.

The walnut caterpillar (Datana integerrima) and fall webworm (Hyphantria cunea) are two of the most serious pests, they commonly eat the foliage in midsummer and continue into autumn.

Codling moth (Cydia pomonella) larvae eat walnut kernels, as well as apple and pear seeds.

Important leaf sucking insects include species of aphids and plant lice including (Monellia spp. and Monelliopsis spp.), which suck the juices from leaves and often deposit a sticky substance called "honey-dew" on the leaf surface that may turn black and prevent photosynthesis; and the walnut lace bug (Corythucha juglandis), which causes damage when the adults and nymphs suck the sap from the lower surfaces of walnut leaflets.

A disease complex known as thousand cankers disease has been threatening black walnut in several western states.  This disease has recently been discovered in Tennessee, and could potentially have devastating effects on the species in the eastern United States. Vectored by the walnut twig beetle (Pityophthorus juglandis), a fungus, Geosmithia morbida, spreads into the wood around the galleries carved by the small beetles.  The fungus causes cankers that inhibit the movement of nutrients in black walnut, leading to crown and branch dieback, and ultimately death.

Allelopathy 

While black walnut is considered allelopathic, meaning it excretes chemicals into its environment that harm competition, research over the past decade has questioned whether this long-held belief holds up to scientifically rigorous examination. Many publications that have repeated claims of black walnut allelopathy cite a very limited set of dated research literature, which has not held up to scientific scrutiny. Anecdotally, records of walnut toxicity to other plants have been observed as far back as the first century when Pliny the Elder wrote: "The shadow of walnut trees is poison to all plants within its compass." 

Like other walnuts, the roots, inner bark, nut husks, and leaves contain a nontoxic chemical called hydrojuglone, when exposed to air or soil compounds it is oxidized into juglone that is biologically active and acts as a respiratory inhibitor to some plants. Juglone is poorly soluble in water and does not move far in the soil and will stay most concentrated in the soil directly beneath the tree. Even after a tree is removed the soil where the roots once were will still contain juglone for several years after the tree is removed as more juglone will be released as the roots decay. Well drained and aerated soils will host a healthy community of soil microbes and these microbes will help to break down the juglone.

Symptoms of juglone poisoning include foliar yellowing and wilting. A number of plants are particularly sensitive.  Apples, tomatoes, pines, and birch are poisoned by juglone, and as a precaution, should not be planted in proximity to a black walnut.

Interaction with horses 
Horses are susceptible to laminitis from exposure to black walnut wood in bedding.

Largest trees 
The US national champion black walnut is on a residential property on Sauvie Island, Oregon.

The tallest black walnut in Europe is located in the Woluwe Park in the city of Sint-Pieters-Woluwe, Brussels, Belgium.

The largest black walnut in Europe is located in the Castle Park in the city of Sereď, Slovakia.

See also 
 English walnut, Persian walnut
 Taxonomy of walnut tree varieties
 Anthelmintic

References

Further reading

Petrides, G. A. and Wehr, J. (1998). Eastern Trees. Houghton Mifflin Company. 
Little, Elbert L. (1980) National Audubon Society Field Guide to North American Trees: Eastern Edition. Borzoi Books.

External links 

A variety index and characteristics guide is available from Missouri Extension.
Guide to "Growing Black Walnuts for Nut Production" University of Missouri Center for Agroforestry

Walnut Council.org homepage
Flora of North America: Juglans nigra—Range distribution Map:
Bioimages.vanderbilt.edu: Juglans nigra images
Set of Black Walnut ID photos and range map
Harvesting Black Walnuts
Home Production of Black Walnut Nutmeats
Growing Black Walnut
Black Walnut crackers
Black Walnut Diagnostic photos: tree, leaves, bark and fruit
The Hiker's Notebook
Black Walnut Toxicity study
Juglans nigra - information, genetic conservation units and related resources. European Forest Genetic Resources Programme (EUFORGEN)

nigra
Edible nuts and seeds
Trees of Eastern Canada
Trees of the Eastern United States
Trees of the Great Lakes region (North America)
Trees of the Northeastern United States
Trees of the North-Central United States
Trees of the Plains-Midwest (United States)
Trees of the Southeastern United States
Walnut, Black
Flora of the Appalachian Mountains
Symbols of Missouri
Trees of humid continental climate
Plants described in 1753
Taxa named by Carl Linnaeus
Plant dyes
Garden plants of North America
Ornamental trees
Flora of Texas
Trees of the Southern United States
Trees of North America
Trees of the United States
Trees of Canada
Trees of the South-Central United States